The Archdiocese of Acerenza is a Roman Catholic ecclesiastical territory of the Latin Church in southern Italy, included in the provinces of Lecce and Potenza. It has existed as a diocese since the fourth or fifth centuries. In the 11th century it was elevated to an archdiocese. In 1203 it was united with the diocese of Matera to form the Archdiocese of Acerenza and Matera. This was separated again in 1954, recreating the Archdiocese of Acerenza, which briefly became the Diocese of Acerenza in 1976 before reverting to an archdiocese in 1977. Its metropolitan is the Archdiocese of Potenza-Muro Lucano-Marsico Nuovo.

History
Acerenza was certainly an episcopal see in the course of the fifth century, for in 499 we meet with the name of its first known bishop, Justus, in the Acts of the Roman Synod of that year. The town was known in antiquity as the "high nest of Acherontia".

Acerenza was in early imperial times a populous and important town, and a bulwark of the territory of Lucania and Apulia. In the Gothic and Lombard period it fell into decay, but was restored by Grimoald II, Duke of Beneventum (687-689). An Archbishop of Acerenza (Giraldus) appears in 1063 in an act of donation of Robert Guiscard to the monastery of the Santissima Trinità in Venosa.

For a few years after 968 Acerenza adopted the Greek Rite in consequence of an order of the Byzantine Emperor Nicephorus Phocas (963-969), whereby it was made one of five suffragans of the archdiocese of Otranto, and compelled to acknowledge the jurisdiction of the Patriarch of Constantinople. 

On 16 June 1102, Pope Paschal II confirmed for the archbishop of Acerenza all his diocese's privileges and possessions, including the suffragan (subordinate) dioceses of Venosa, Gravina, Tricarico, Tursi, and Potenza, whose bishops he had the right of confirming and consecrating.<ref>F. Ughelli Italia Sacra VII (Venice 1721), p. 29. P. Kehr Italia pontificia IX, p. 458, no. 9: "munit Acherontinam ecclesiam apost. decreti auctoritate et confirmat, quaecumque metropolitano iure praeteritis temporibus ei pertinuisse noscuntur, videlicet Venusium, Gravinam, Tricaricum, Tursum, Potentiam, ut potestatem habeat in eis episcopos ordinandi ac consecrandi."</ref>

Pope Urban VI (1378–1389), Bartolommeo Prignano, was once Archbishop of Acerenza.

Acerenza Cathedral is known for a bust which has long been supposed to be that of Saint Canius, patron of the city, to whom the cathedral is dedicated, but which is now judged to be a portrait-bust of Julian the Apostate, though others maintain that it is a bust of the Emperor Frederick II, after the manner of the sculptors of the Antonine age.

List of bishops/archbishops
Bishops of AcerenzaDown to 'Joseph', the names and duration of the bishops are traditional and undocumented. Romanus (300–329)
 Monocollus (for 8 years)
 Petrus I (for 3 years)
 Sylvius (for 5 years)
 Theodosius (for 8 years)
 Aloris (for 22 years)
 Stephanus Primus (for 2 years)
 Araldus (for 4 years)
 Bertus (for 3 years)
 Leo I (for 23 years)
 Lupus (for 3 years)
 Evalanius (for 12 years)
 Azo (for 3 years)
 Asedeus (for 8 years)
 Joseph (for 23 years)
...
 Justus of Acerenza (occurs 499)
...
 Leo II (occurs 799)
 Peter II (833)
 Rudolf (869–874)
 Leo III (874–904)
 Andrea (906–935)
 Johannes I (936–972)
 Johannes II (993–996)
 Stephan II (996–1024)

Bishops or Archbishops of Acerenzaat some point during the 11th century, before 1063, the diocese was elevated to an archdiocese Stephan III (1029–1041)
 Stephan IV (1041–1048)
 Goderio I (1048–1058)
 Goderio II (1058–1059)

Archbishops of Acerenza

 Godano or Gelardo (1059–1066)
 Arnald (1066–1101)
 Peter III (1102–1142)
 Durando (1142–1151)
 Robert I (1151–1178)
 Riccardo (1178–1184)
 Peter IV (1184–1194)
 Peter V (1194–1197)
 Rainaldo (1198–1199)
 Andrea (1200–1231)

Archbishops of Acerenza and MateraFrom 1203 to 1954 the archbishopric of Acerenza was joined to that of the Diocese of Matera to form the Archbishopric of Acerenza and Matera Andrea (1200–1231 and 1236–1246)
 Anselm (1252–1267)
 Lorenz (1268–1276)
 Pietro d'Archia (1277–1299)
 Gentile Orsini (1300–1303)
 Guido (or Guglielmo) (1303–1306)
 Landolfo (or Rudolfo) (1306–1308)
 Robert II (1308–1334)
 Pietro VII (1334–1343)
 Giovanni Corcello (1343–1363)
 Bartolomeo Prignano, later Pope Urban VI (1363–1377)
 Niccolò Acconciamuro (1377–1378)
 Giacomo di Silvestro (1379)
 Bisanzio Morelli (1380–1391)
 Pietro Giovanni de Baraballis (1392–1394)
 Stefano Goberio (1395–1402)
 Riccardo de Olibano (1402–1407)
 Niccolò Piscicello (1407–1414)
 Manfredi Aversano (1414–1444)
 Marino de Paolis (1444–1470)
 Francesco Enrico Lunguardo (1471–1482)
 Vincenzo Palmieri (1483–1518)
 Andrea Matteo Palmieri (1518–1528)
 Luigi de Palmieri, O.F.M. (1528–1530)
 Apostolic Administrator Andrea Matteo Palmieri (1530–1531) Giovanni Michele Saraceni (1531–1556)
 Sigismondo Saraceno (1558–1585)
 Francesco Antonio Santorio (1586–1588)
 Francisco Avellaneda (Francesco de Abillaneda) (20 March 1591 to 3 September 1591)
 Scipione de Tolfa (1593–1595)
 Giovanni Myra (1596–1600)Sede vacante (1600–1606) Giuseppe de Rossi (1606–1610)
 Giovanni Spilla, O.P. (Juan de Espila) (1611–1619)
 Fabrizio Antinori (1621–1630)
 Giandomenico Spinola (1630–1632)
 Simone Carafa Roccella, C.R. (1638–1647)
 Giambattista Spinola (1648–1664)
 Vincenzo Lanfranchi (1665–1676)
 Antonio del Río Colmenares (1678–1702)
 Antonio Maria Brancaccio, C.R. (1703–1722)
 Giuseppe Maria Positano, O.P. (1723–1729)
 Alfonso Miraconda, O.S.B. (1730–1737)
 Giovanni Rossi, C.R. (1737–1738)
 Francesco Lanfreschi, C.R. (1738–1754)
 Antonio Ludovico Antinori, Cong.Orat. (1754–1758)
 Serafino Filangeri, O.S.B. (1759–1762)
 Nicola Filomarini, O.S.B. (1763–1768)
 Carlo Parlati (1768–1774)
 Giuseppe Sparano (1775–1776)
 Francesco Zunica (1776–1796)
 Camillo Cattaneo della Volta (1797–1834)
 Antonio Di Macco (1835–1854)
 Gaetano Rossini (1855–1867)
 Pietro Giovine (1871–1879)
 Gesualdo Nicola Loschirico, O.F.M. Cap. (1880–1890)
 Francesco Maria Imparati, O.F.M. (1890–1892)
 Raffaele di Nonno, C.Ss.R. (1893–1895)
 Diomede Angelo Raffaele Gennaro Falconio, O.F.M. (1895–1899)
 Raffaele Rossi (1900–1906)
 Anselmo Filippo Pecci, O.S.B. (1907–1945)
 Vincenzo Cavalla (1946–1954)

Archbishops of AcerenzaAcerenza and Matera were separated again into two archdioceses on 2 July 1954 Domenico Pecchinenna (1954–1961)
 Corrado Ursi (1961–1966) (also Archbishop of Naples)
 Giuseppe Vairo (1966–1979)
 Francesco Cuccarese (1979–1987)
 Michele Scandiffio (1988–2005)
 Giovanni Ricchiuti (2005–Present)

Notes

Bibliography
Reference works for bishops
 
  
 
 
 

Studies
Kehr, Paulus Fridolin (1962). Italia pontificia. Regesta pontificum Romanorum.'' Vol. IX: Samnia – Apulia – Lucania.  Berlin: Weidmann. pp. 452–467.
Schwartz, Gerhard (1907). Die Besetzung der Bistümer Reichsitaliens unter den sächsischen und salischen Kaisern: mit den Listen der Bischöfe, 951-1122.  Leipzig: B.G. Teubner. pp. 772–779.

External links 
Diocese of Acerenza website: list of bishops 

Roman Catholic dioceses in Basilicata
Acerenza